Jean-loup Gailly (born 1956) is a French computer scientist and an author of gzip. He wrote the compression code of the portable archiver of the Info-ZIP and the tools compatible with the PKZIP archiver for MS-DOS. He worked over zlib in collaboration with Mark Adler. He prefers to write his hyphenated first name with only the J but not the L capitalized.

He wrote a chapter on fractal image compression for Mark Nelson's The Data Compression Book.

From 1981—1989 He worked as a senior developer on Ada compilers for Alsys.

From 1990 to 1995, while working for Chorus Systèmes SA, he designed the real-time executive of the ChorusOS microkernel.

From 1999 to 2001, he was the CTO of Mandrakesoft.

From 2006 to 2014, he worked at Google as a Tech. Lead Manager.

References

External links 
 Jean-loup's home page
 Jean-loup Gailly on gzip, Go and Mandrake, an interview on Slashdot

Living people
Computer programmers
GNU people
Google employees
1956 births